Anadevidia is a genus of moths of the family Noctuidae.

Species
 Anadevidia hebetata (Butler, 1889)
 Anadevidia peponis (Fabricius, 1775)

References
 Anadevidia at Markku Savela's Lepidoptera and some other life forms
 Natural History Museum Lepidoptera genus database

Plusiinae
Noctuoidea genera